Jalalvand may refer to:
 Jalalvand-e Olya
 Jalalvand-e Sofla
 Jalalvand Rural District